Hilde Benjamin ( Lange; 5 February 1902 – 18 April 1989) was an East German judge and Minister of Justice of the German Democratic Republic. She is most notorious for presiding over the East German show trials of the 1950s, which drew comparisons to the Nazi Party's Volksgericht show trials under Judge Roland Freisler. Hilde Benjamin is particularly known for being responsible for the politically motivated prosecution of Erna Dorn and Ernst Jennrich. In his 1994 inauguration speech German President Roman Herzog cited Hilde Benjamin as a symbol of totalitarianism and injustice, and called both her name and legacy incompatible with the German Constitution and with the rule of law.

Life

Childhood and education 
Hilde Lange was born in Bernburg, Anhalt, and grew up in Berlin, in to a middle class and liberal minded Protestant family, the daughter of the engineer Heinz Lange and his wife, Adele. Growing up in the culturally inclined liberal ambience of a middle-class family awakened in her an early interest in classical music and German literature: this would stay with her throughout her life.  In 1921 she successfully completed her school career at the Fichtenberg High School in Steglitz on the south side of Berlin.

She was among the first women to study the law of Germany, which she did at Berlin, Heidelberg, and Hamburg from 1921 to 1924.

Politics and early career 
Afterwards, she worked as a practicing attorney in Berlin-Wedding for the Rote Hilfe, a Communist aid organization. In 1926 she married the medical doctor, Georg Benjamin, the brother of writer Walter Benjamin and of her friend, the academic Dora Benjamin.  Georg and Hilde's son, Michael was born at the end of 1932.

In 1926 she quit the moderate left-wing SPD and in 1927 joined her husband in the Communist Party. Because of her political convictions, she was forbidden to practice law after 1933.  Briefly jobless, with her husband removed to a concentration camp (from which, on this occasion, he was released later in the year) directly after the Reichstag fire, she returned for a time to live with her parents along with her small son:  she then obtained a position providing legal advice for the Soviet trade association in Berlin. During World War II, she was forced to work in a factory from 1939–45. Her Jewish husband was killed at the KZ Mauthausen in 1942.

Post war in the German Democratic Republic 
After the war, she joined the Socialist Unity Party of Germany (SED) in 1946 and was vice president of the Supreme Court of the German Democratic Republic (GDR) from 1949 to 1953. In that capacity, she assisted with the Waldheim Trials and presided over a series of show trials against those identified as political undesirables, such as Johann Burianek and Wolfgang Kaiser, as well as against Jehovah's Witnesses. Her behavior and statements from the bench and regular death sentences earned Hilde Benjamin the nicknames, "Red Hilde", "The Red Freisler," and, "The Red Guillotine."

From 1949 to 1967 she was a member of the Volkskammer and from 1954 to 1989, a member of the Central Committee of the SED. In 1953, she succeeded Max Fechner as Minister of Justice. GDR leader Walter Ulbricht asked her to resign in 1967, ostensibly for health reasons.

Benjamin was instrumental in authoring the penal code and the code of penal procedure of the GDR and played a decisive role in the reorganization of the country's legal system. From 1967 to her death, she held the chair for the history of the judiciary at the Deutsche Akademie für Staats- und Rechtswissenschaft in Potsdam-Babelsberg. She died in East Berlin in April 1989.

Recognition 
Benjamin received several awards in the GDR: in 1962 the Patriotic Order of Merit, in 1977 and 1987 the Order of Karl Marx, in 1979 the title of Meritorious Jurist of the GDR (Verdiente Juristin der DDR), and in 1982 the Star of People's Friendship.

Literature 

 Andrea Feth, Hilde Benjamin – Eine Biographie, Berlin 1995 
 Marianne Brentzel, Die Machtfrau Hilde Benjamin 1902–1989, Berlin 1997 
 Heike Wagner, Hilde Benjamin und die Stalinisierung der DDR-Justiz, Aachen 1999 
 Heike Amos, Kommunistische Personalpolitik in der Justizverwaltung der SBZ/DDR (1945–1953) : Vom liberalen Justizfachmann Eugen Schiffer über den Parteifunktionär Max Fechner zur kommunistischen Juristin Hilde Benjamin, in: Gerd Bender, Recht im Sozialismus : Analysen zur Normdurchsetzung in osteuropäischen Nachkriegsgesellschaften (1944/45-1989), Frankfurt am Main 1999, Seiten 109–145. 
 Zwischen Recht und Unrecht – Lebensläufe deutscher Juristen'', Justizministerium NRW 2004, S. 144–146

References

External links 

FemBiographie: Hilde Benjamin 
Biographie: Hilde Benjamin 
Biography at ddr-im-www.de 

1902 births
1989 deaths
People from Bernburg
People from the Duchy of Anhalt
Communist Party of Germany politicians
Members of the Central Committee of the Socialist Unity Party of Germany
People from East Berlin
Justice ministers of Germany
Members of the Provisional Volkskammer
Members of the 1st Volkskammer
Members of the 2nd Volkskammer
Members of the 3rd Volkskammer
Members of the 4th Volkskammer
Democratic Women's League of Germany members
Women government ministers of East Germany
Female members of the Volkskammer
Female justice ministers
20th-century German judges
East German judges
German women judges
Recipients of the Patriotic Order of Merit
20th-century women judges
East German women